Claridge is a surname. Notable people with the surname include:

 Bruce Claridge, Canadian football player
 Christie Claridge, American beauty pageant contestant
 Dennis Claridge (1941–2018), American football player
 George Claridge (1794–1856), English cricketer
 George Frederick Claridge (1852–1931), South Australian philanthropist
 Gordon Claridge, British psychologist
 John Thomas Claridge (1792–1868), British lawyer and judge
 Manuela Kasper-Claridge (born 1959), German journalist
 Captain R. T. Claridge (Richard Tappin Claridge) (c. 1797–1857), English pioneer in asphalt production and hydrotherapy
 Ryan Claridge (born 1981), American football player
 Shaaron Claridge, American voice actress
 Steve Claridge (born 1966), English footballer, coach and pundit
 Travis Claridge (1978–2006), American football player
 Michael Claridge (born 1934), British entomologist.

See also
 Claridge Hi-Tec/Goncz Pistol
 Claridge Hotel (disambiguation), various hotels
 Claridge Records, a New York-based record label
 Claridge, Pennsylvania
 Clarridge (surname)